Mihály Farkas (born Hermann Lőwy; 18 July 1904  – 6 December 1965) was a Hungarian  Communist politician who served as Minister of National Defense of the Hungarian People's Republic.

Biography 
He was born in 1904 in Abaújszántó to Jewish parents, in the Abaúj-Torna County of the Kingdom of Hungary, and became a Communist in the 1920s. He lived in Košice and Prague then. He fought in the Spanish Civil War; later he moved to the Soviet Union. He returned to Hungary in late 1944 alongside other Hungarian communists and became a member of the Central Committee, the Political Committee and the Secretariat of the Hungarian Communist Party from May 1945. In 1945 he became under-secretary of Home Affairs. In 1946 he was elected deputy secretary and became the chairman of the party's Management Committee.

He was Minister of National Defence from 9 September 1948 to 2 July 1953. He was one of the main instigators during the Rákosi era. In 1956 he was expelled from the party and convicted. He was released from prison in 1961 and spent his last years working as an editor and publisher in Budapest, where he died in 1965.

His son Vladimir was a colonel of the security police during the Rákosi era.

Awards 

Order of the Hungarian People's Republic 1st and 2nd Classes (1949)

Order of the Freedom Silver Class (1945) and Golden Class (1946)

Order of Kossuth 1st Class (1950)

Medal for Public Security Silver Grade (1947, awarded for the services as Ministry of the Interior State Security)

1848-1948 Commemorative Medal

Medal "For the Victory Over Germany in the Great Patriotic War 1941–1945"

Merit of the Star of the Garibaldi Brigade (1945)

Military Order of the White Lion 2nd Class (1945)

References

Sources
 Magyar Életrajzi Lexikon 1000–1990

1904 births
1965 deaths
People from Abaújszántó
People from the Kingdom of Hungary
Jewish Hungarian politicians
Hungarian Communist Party politicians
Members of the Hungarian Working People's Party
Defence ministers of Hungary
Members of the National Assembly of Hungary (1945–1947)
Members of the National Assembly of Hungary (1947–1949)
Members of the National Assembly of Hungary (1949–1953)
Members of the National Assembly of Hungary (1953–1958)
People of the Hungarian Revolution of 1956
Jewish socialists
Jewish anti-fascists
Burials at Farkasréti Cemetery